Wan Amirul Afiq bin Wan Ab Rahman (born 18 July 1992) is a Malaysian footballer who plays as a defender for Malaysia Super League club Kedah Darul Aman.

Career statistics

Club

Honours

Melaka United
 Malaysia Premier League: 2016

Felda United
 Malaysia Premier League: 2018

References

External links
 

1992 births
People from Kelantan
Living people
Malaysian footballers
Malaysia international footballers
Felda United F.C. players
Melaka United F.C. players
Kedah Darul Aman F.C. players
Malaysia Super League players
Association football defenders